Soda Springs (formerly, Summit Valley, Soda Springs Station, Hopkins, Hopkins Springs, and Tinkers Station) is an unincorporated community and census-designated place (CDP) in Nevada County, California, United States. The population was 81 at the 2010 census.

The Soda Springs Ski Resort is located just off Highway 80 near the Donner Summit.

History
Mark Hopkins and Leland Stanford established a resort at the location in the 1880s.

The Summit Valley post office opened in 1870, changed its name to Soda Springs in 1875, and closed in 1881. It was reopened in 1929. The Hopkins post office operated from 1885 to 1886. Alternately it was reportedly known as Hopkins Springs until the Soda Springs post office was established on March 8, 1875.

The Central Pacific Railroad station was named Tinkers Station from 1867 to 1873, commemorating J.A. Tinker.  Tinker was a "rough, hard-driving, hard-drinking teamster" who hauled freight between the mines on Forest Hill Divide and Soda Springs.

Geography
According to the United States Census Bureau, the CDP covers an area of 0.3 square miles (0.9 km), all of it land

Climate
Soda Springs has a dry-summer continental climate (Köppen climate classification Dsb) that is characterized by warm, dry summers, and cold, extremely snowy winters. Snow depth peaks at 93 inches (236.2 cm) during March. Soda Springs is listed as the snowiest place in the state of California.

Demographics
The 2010 United States Census reported that Soda Springs had a population of 81. The racial makeup of Soda Springs was 79 (97.5%) White, 0 (0.0%) African American, 2 (2.5%) Native American, 0 (0.0%) Asian, 0 (0.0%) Pacific Islander, 0 (0.0%) from other races, and 0 (0.0%) from two or more races. Hispanic or Latino of any race were 7 persons (8.6%).

The Census reported that 81 people (100% of the population) lived in households, 0 (0%) lived in non-institutionalized group quarters, and 0 (0%) were institutionalized.

There were 41 households, out of which 6 (14.6%) had children under the age of 18 living in them, 8 (19.5%) were opposite-sex married couples living together, 2 (4.9%) had a female householder with no husband present, 5 (12.2%) had a male householder with no wife present.  There were 3 (7.3%) unmarried opposite-sex partnerships, and 0 (0%) same-sex married couples or partnerships. 17 households (41.5%) were made up of individuals, and 1 (2.4%) had someone living alone who was 65 years of age or older. The average household size was 1.98.  There were 15 families (36.6% of all households); the average family size was 2.33.

The population was spread out, with 9 people (11.1%) under the age of 18, 9 people (11.1%) aged 18 to 24, 34 people (42.0%) aged 25 to 44, 21 people (25.9%) aged 45 to 64, and 8 people (9.9%) who were 65 years of age or older.  The median age was 35.8 years. For every 100 females, there were 211.5 males.  For every 100 females age 18 and over, there were 200.0 males.

The homeowner vacancy rate was 4.5%; the rental vacancy rate was 4.8%.  42 people (51.9% of the population) lived in owner-occupied housing units and 39 people (48.1%) lived in rental housing units.

Politics

References

Unincorporated communities in California
Census-designated places in Nevada County, California
Lake Tahoe
Census-designated places in California